Crnić is a South Slavic surname. It may refer to:

 Ivica Crnić, Minister of Justice of Croatia (1992-1995)
 Jadranko Crnić (1928–2008), Croatian lawyer and judge
 Josip Crnić (born 1989), Croatian handball player
 Jovan Crnić (born 1994), Serbian basketball player

See also
 Črnic, Slovene form